The year 2005 is the 13th year in the history of Pancrase, a mixed martial arts promotion based in Japan. In 2005 Pancrase held 17 events beginning with Pancrase: Spiral 1.

Title fights

Events list

Pancrase: Spiral 1

Pancrase: Spiral 1 was an event held on February 4, 2005 at Korakuen Hall in Tokyo, Japan.

Results

Pancrase: 2005 Neo-Blood Tournament Eliminations

Pancrase: 2005 Neo-Blood Tournament Eliminations was an event held on February 27, 2005 at Gold's Gym South Tokyo Annex in Tokyo, Japan.

Results

Pancrase: Spiral 2

Pancrase: Spiral 2 was an event held on March 6, 2005 at Yokohama Cultural Gymnasium in Yokohama, Kanagawa, Japan.

Results

Pancrase: Spiral 3

Pancrase: Spiral 3 was an event held on April 10, 2005 at Umeda Stella Hall in Osaka, Osaka, Japan.

Results

Pancrase: Spiral 4

Pancrase: Spiral 4 was an event held on May 1, 2005 at Yokohama Cultural Gymnasium in Yokohama, Kanagawa, Japan.

Results

Pancrase: Hybrid Fight 2005

Pancrase: Hybrid Fight 2005 was an event held on May 22, 2005 at Hybrid Wrestling Kagoshima Gym in Izumi, Kagoshima, Japan.

Results

Pancrase: 2005 Neo-Blood Tournament Semifinals

Pancrase: 2005 Neo-Blood Tournament Semifinals was an event held on June 5, 2005 at Gold's Gym South Tokyo Annex in Tokyo, Japan.

Results

Pancrase: Spiral 5

Pancrase: Spiral 5 was an event held on July 10, 2005 at Yokohama Cultural Gymnasium in Yokohama, Japan.

Results

Pancrase: Spiral 6

Pancrase: Spiral 6 was an event held on July 31, 2005 at Korakuen Hall in Tokyo, Japan.

Results

Pancrase: Hybrid Fight 2005

Pancrase: Hybrid Fight 2005 was an event held on August 7, 2005 at Hybrid Wrestling Kagoshima Gym in Izumi, Kagoshima, Japan.

Results

Pancrase: 2005 Neo-Blood Tournament Finals

Pancrase: 2005 Neo-Blood Tournament Finals was an event held on August 27, 2005 at Korakuen Hall in Tokyo, Japan.

Results

Pancrase: Z

Pancrase: Z was an event held on September 3, 2005 at Grand Messe Kumamoto in Kumamoto, Kumamoto, Japan.

Results

Pancrase: Spiral 7

Pancrase: Spiral 7 was an event held on September 4, 2005 at Umeda Stella Hall in Osaka, Osaka, Japan.

Results

Pancrase: Spiral 8

Pancrase: Spiral 8 was an event held on October 2, 2005 at Yokohama Cultural Gymnasium in Yokohama, Kanagawa, Japan.

Results

Pancrase: Hybrid Fight 2005

Pancrase: Hybrid Fight 2005 was an event held on October 23, 2005 at Hybrid Wrestling Kagoshima Gym in Izumi, Kagoshima, Japan.

Results

Pancrase: Spiral 9

Pancrase: Spiral 9 was an event held on November 4, 2005 at Korakuen Hall in Tokyo, Japan.

Results

Pancrase: Spiral 10

Pancrase: Spiral 10 was an event held on December 4, 2005 at Differ Ariake Arena in Tokyo, Japan.

Results

See also 
 Pancrase
 List of Pancrase champions
 List of Pancrase events

References

Pancrase events
2005 in mixed martial arts